Liochrysogaster is a genus of hoverflies

Species
L. przewalskii Stackelberg, 1924

References

Hoverfly genera
Taxa named by Aleksandr Stackelberg
Eristalinae